Love In Bombay is a 2013 Indian Hindi-language romantic comedy film produced and directed by Joy Mukherjee. The film was originally made in 1971 and starred Ashok Kumar, Kishore Kumar, Joy Mukherjee, Waheeda Rehman, Rehman. It is the third film of Mukherjee's Love In trilogy, includes Love In Simla and Love In Tokyo. Music director duo Shankar–Jaikishan had composed music for this film which features songs by the legend artists of golden era like Kishore Kumar, 
Mohammed Rafi and Asha Bhosle. Due to lack of funds this movie couldn't release in its own time. After Joy Mukherjee's death, his son Toy had put in efforts and made arrangements of the release of the movie.

Plot
This film is a simple story of a village boy, Baadal (Joy Mukherjee) who meets a girl from the city, Preeti (Waheeda Rehman) in the most unusual circumstances and the couple eventually fall in love, and wish to get married. However, this is unacceptable to Preeti's father, played by Rehman, who wants her to marry Roshan. The latter is actually a scheming villain and he tries all methods to separate the couple. There's a lot of drama, jealousy, and a challenge that ensues, but Baadal ends up triumphant through it all. The most fun element was Kishore Kumar's character, Ganpat Rao, who effortlessly makes you smile from the time he enters the scene. Then there's the moment of unity for actor brothers Ashok Kumar and Kishore Kumar, which was heartwarming for more reasons than just their screen presence together. In real life, they are maternal uncles to the Hero-cum-filmmaker, Joy Mukherjee.

Cast
Ashok Kumar as Usman Bhai
Kishore Kumar as Ganpat Rao
Joy Mukherjee as Baadal
Waheeda Rehman as Preeti Mehra 
Rehman as Mr. Mehra

Soundtrack
This movie was unique because this was probably the first occasion when the famed lyricist Majrooh Sultanpuri wrote songs for a film in which music was composed by Shankar–Jaikishan.

Track list

References

External links
 

2010s Hindi-language films
Indian romantic comedy films
Films set in Mumbai
2013 films
Films set in 1971
2013 romantic comedy films